Magnus Carlsson (born April 20, 1965) is a Swedish illustrator, director and animator.

Biography
Carlsson was born in Gothemburg, Västra Götaland, and is one of Sweden's best known and most active animators. He started animating professionally in 1988, and has since created a series of animated films and television series. Among other things, he has created The Three Friends and Jerry, which has been distributed to over 100 countries. He also created Radiohead's video for the song "Paranoid Android", for which he was nominated for a number of MTV Video Music Awards. Carlsson has also made the stop-motion animated feature film Desmond & the Swamp Barbarian Trap, which premiered on 19 November 2006.

Filmography

Television
 Robin (1996)
 Lisa (1998)
 The Three Friends and Jerry (De tre vännerna och Jerry) (1998)
 Da Möb (2001)

Film
 Desmond's Trashed Apple Tree (Desmonds trashade äppelträd) (2004)
 Desmond & the Swamp Barbarian Trap (Desmond & träskpatraskfällan) (2006)

References

External links 
 Magnus Carlsson - Official website
 

Swedish animators
Swedish animated film directors
1965 births
Living people